Equation were a British, young Devon-based folk supergroup formed in 1995, which combined the core talents of the Lakeman Brothers with Kathryn Roberts and Kate Rusby, later replaced for a spell by Cara Dillon.

Their first single "He Loves Me" was originally released in 1996 on the Blanco y Negro-WEA label and was followed by four studio albums.

The Times reviewed their first album release Hazy Daze. in 1998, scoring 7/10 and giving a favourable comparison to Fairport Convention.

Discography

Albums
Hazy Daze (1998, Blanco Y Negro -WEA) - (Putumayo US)
The Lucky Few (1998, Blackburtst Records - Rough Trade) - (Putumayo US)
First Name Terms (2002 IScream Music )
Return to Me (Recorded 1995/1996 - Released 2003, Rough Trade Records)

Singles and EPs
"In Session" (1995) 
"He Loves Me" (1996)
The Dark Ages EP (2000)

References

English folk musical groups
Folk music supergroups